Montpelier Historic District is a national historic district located at Montpelier, Hanover County, Virginia. The district includes 43 contributing buildings and 1 contributing site in the village of Montpelier.  It includes residences, agricultural buildings, stores, businesses, a church, schools and libraries that illustrate the wide range of building types.  Notable buildings include the old school (1876), Church of Our Savior (1882), Grange Hall (1899), Hobart Hardware (c. 1900), Montpelier School (1929), "Norway" House (1936), and "The Oaks" (1936).  Located in the district and listed separately is the Sycamore Tavern, the only 18th-century building remaining in the district.

It was listed on the National Register of Historic Places in 2002.

References

Historic districts in Hanover County, Virginia
National Register of Historic Places in Hanover County, Virginia
Historic districts on the National Register of Historic Places in Virginia
U.S. Route 33